Bhatia may refer to:

Castes
 Bhatia caste

People
Bhatia is a surname of Indian origin. Notable people with the surname include:
 Akshay Bhatia, American golfer
 Amir Bhatia, Baron Bhatia (born 1932), British businessman
 Amit Bhatia (born 1979), vice-chairman of the English football club Queen's Park Rangers
 Avadh Bhatia (1921–1984), Canadian physicist
 Eduardo Bhatia (born 1964), President of the Senate of Puerto Rico
 Michael V. Bhatia, American academic
 Nav Bhatia Sikh Businessman, Toronto Raptors "superfan"
 Param Singh Bhatia, Indian actor
 Peter Bhatia American Journalist
 Rafiq Bhatia, guitarist and producer of rock band Son Lux
 Rajat Bhatia (cricketer), Indian cricketer, born 1979
 Rajendra Bhatia, Indian mathematician
 Rajiv Hari Om Bhatia, AKA Akshay Kumar, Bollywood actor
 Ranjit Bhatia, former Indian athlete
 R. L. Bhatia (1921–2021), Indian political figure
 Ruby Bhatia (born 1973), popular Indian television personality
 Sabeer Bhatia (born 1968), co-founder of Hotmail and entrepreneur
 Sangeeta N. Bhatia (born 1968), biological engineer
 Sanjay Bhatia Indian Parliamentarian
 Sohan Lal Bhatia, army officer, physiologist
Surita Bhatia, American chemist
 Tamanna Bhatia, Indian model and actress
 Vanraj Bhatia (1927–2021), Indian music composer
 Virendra Bhatia (1947–2010), Indian politician